Calozenillia is a genus of flies in the family Tachinidae.

Species
C. auronigra Townsend, 1927
C. tamara (Portschinsky, 1884)

References

Tachinidae genera
Exoristinae
Taxa named by Charles Henry Tyler Townsend